"Acts of Vengeance" is a comic book crossover storyline that ran through several titles published by Marvel Comics from December 1989 to February 1990.

Publication history
This company-wide fall crossover was centered on the Avengers and Fantastic Four after three consecutive fall crossovers were built around the X-Men and related mutant teams. Promotional materials teased the idea of a wide array of super-villains facing heroes they had never met, or were not part of the heroes' regular rogues gallery.

The core titles of the crossover include Avengers; Avengers Spotlight; Avengers West Coast; Captain America; Iron Man; Quasar; Thor; and Fantastic Four. Major tie-ins included The Amazing Spider-Man
among other Spider-Man titles, Uncanny X-Men  and the second Damage Control  limited series. An epilogue features in Cloak and Dagger; Web of Spider-Man and in an Avengers Annual. A humorous parody with the character the Impossible Man features in the title Silver Surfer.

A thematic sequel, Acts of Evil, was published in 2019, the 30th anniversary of Acts of Vengeance.

Plot summary
A mysterious stranger (the Asgardian god Loki in disguise) coerces a group of master supervillains to join forces in a conspiracy to destroy the superhero team the Avengers. Loki does this to strike back at his adopted brother Thor, and due to his bitterness that he inadvertently caused the formation of the Avengers. The supervillain team consists of Doctor Doom, the Kingpin, Magneto, the Mandarin, the Red Skull, and the Wizard. Loki also attempts to recruit Apocalypse, Cobra, and the Mad Thinker, but they all decline. Loki also approaches Namor, but he rejects the offer stating he is not a villain anymore.

To assist the master villains, Loki engineers a jailbreak at the Vault. The lesser villains are then directed against heroes (mainly the Avengers and Spider-Man) who have never fought them before, the theory being that the unfamiliarity will act in the villains' favor.

While they did manage to give many of the heroes unusual fights, the plan eventually fails as the master villains fail to cooperate and bicker with each other. An example of this is where Magneto, a mutant and a Jewish Holocaust survivor, attacks the Red Skull, whose Nazi beliefs include a prejudice against mutants, and imprisons him in a buried crypt. The supervillain pawns are defeated by the heroes. A frustrated Loki reveals himself and imprisons the Red Skull, the Mandarin and the Wizard. Meanwhile, Doctor Doom is revealed to have been using a Doombot, the Kingpin makes a timely exit and Magneto is not present. The Avengers track the group and defeat the villains, with Thor forcing Loki to flee back to their native home of Asgard.

Loki commits one last act of villainy and fuses three Sentinels to form the robot Tri-Sentinel, so that it can destroy New York City. The Tri-Sentinel is stopped by Spider-Man, who at the time possessed the powers of Captain Universe.

Cast of characters

Heroes
 Alpha Flight
Box
 Diamond Lil
 Talisman
 Vindicator
 Avengers
 Black Widow
 Captain America
 Falcon
 Firebird
 Hawkeye
 Hellcat
 Iron Man
 Mockingbird
 Moondragon
 Photon
 Sersi
 She-Hulk
 Thor
 Wasp
 Wonder Man
 Clea
 Cloak and Dagger
 Daredevil
 Doctor Strange
 Fantastic Four
 Mister Fantastic
 Invisible Woman
 Human Torch
 Thing
 Gamma Flight
 Wild Child
 Witchfire
 Hulk
 Moon Knight
 New Mutants
 Rusty
 Skids
 New Warriors
 Firestar
 Justice
 Namorita
 Night Thrasher
 Nova
 Speedball
 Nick Fury
 Power Pack
 Alex Power
 Jack Power
 Julie Power
 Katie Power
 Puma
 Punisher
 Quasar
 Silver Surfer
 Spider-Man
 West Coast Avengers
 Henry Pym
 Human Torch Android
 Scarlet Witch
 U.S. Agent
 Vision
 X-Men
 Jubilee
 Psylocke
 Wolverine

Prime movers
 Loki
 Doctor Doom
 Magneto
 Kingpin
 Wizard
 Mandarin
 Red Skull

Villain participants
 Absorbing Man
 Angar the Screamer
 Arkon
 Armadillo
 Asp
 The Assembly of Evil
 Hulk Robot
 Fenris
 Hydro-Man
 Jester
 Rock
 Awesome Android
 Baron Brimstone
 Beetle
 Boomerang
 Brothers Grimm
 Bushwacker
 Cactus
 Chemistro (Calvin Carr)
 Coachwhip
 Constrictor
 Controller
 Crossbones
 Dittomaster
 Dragon Man
 Eel (Edward Lavell)
 Electro
 Enchantress
 Executioner
 Flying Tiger
 The Freedom Force
 Avalanche
 Blob
 Pyro
 Gargantua
 Giganto (Deviant Mutate version)
 Goliath (Erik Josten)
 Graviton
 Grey Gargoyle
 Grey Hulk
 Griffin
 Hobgoblin (Jason Macendale)
 Hydro-Man
 Juggernaut
 Killer Shrike
 Klaw
 Kristoff Vernard
 Lady Mandarin
 Living Laser
 Llan the Sorcerer
 Mad Dog
 Man-Ape
 Mister Hyde
 Mole Man
 Molten Man
 Namor (mind-controlled by Controller when found out he wasn't a villain any more)
 Nekra
 Nitro
 Orka
 Owl
 Plant Man
 Quill (Resistants Version)
 Ramrod
 Rattler
 Red Ghost
 Rhino
 Ringer (Keith Kraft)
 Scarecrow
 Scorpion
 Screaming Mimi
 Sebastian Shaw
 Shocker
 Stilt-Man
 Super-Adaptoid
 TESS-One
 Terminus
 Tiger Shark
 Tinkerer
 Titania
 Trapster
 Tricephalous
 Tri-Sentinel
 Typhoid Mary
 The U-Foes
 Ironclad
 Vapor
 Vector
 X-Ray
 Ulik?
 U.L.T.I.M.A.T.U.M.
 Anarchy
 Flag-Smasher
 Ultron-13
 Vanisher
 Venom
 Voice
 Vulture
 Water Wizard
 Whirlwind
 The Wrecking Crew
 Bulldozer
 Piledriver
 Thunderball
 Wrecker
 Yetrigar

Other villains that Loki tried to get involved as members of the inner circle of major villains (but who turned him down) are Apocalypse, Cobra, and the Mad Thinker.

Issues and events
The following issues are listed in chronological order:

Thor #410 (one page only) - #411
The Mutant Misadventures of Cloak & Dagger #8 (one page only)
Avengers Spotlight #26
The New Mutants #84 - (two pages only) - #85 
The following issues are approximately in reading order:
Avengers Spotlight #26
The New Mutants #86
X-Factor #50 (six pages only)
Damage Control (vol. 2) #1
The Avengers #311
Thor #410
Captain America #365
Fantastic Four #334
The Amazing Spider-Man #326
The Spectacular Spider-Man #158
Wolverine (vol. 2) #19-20
The Mutant Misadventures of Cloak and Dagger (vol. 3) #8-9
Web of Spider-Man #59
Power Pack #53
The Incredible Hulk #363
Marc Spector: Moon Knight #8-9
Doctor Strange, Sorcerer Supreme #11-12
Fantastic Four #335-336 
The Amazing Spider-Man #327
The Spectacular Spider-Man #159
Web of Spider-Man #60
Doctor Strange, Sorcerer Supreme #13
Marc Spector: Moon Knight #10
Alpha Flight #79-80
Daredevil #275-276
Thor #411-412
Avengers West Coast #53
Quasar #5
Avengers Spotlight #27
Iron Man #251
The Amazing Spider-Man #328
The Spectacular Spider-Man #160
Web of Spider-Man #61
Uncanny X-Men #256-257
The Avengers #312
The Punisher (vol. 2) #28-29
The Punisher War Journal #12-13
Captain America #366
The Mutant Misadventures of Cloak and Dagger #10
Iron Man #252
Avengers West Coast #54
Quasar #6-7
Avengers Spotlight #28
The Avengers #313
Captain America #367
Avengers Spotlight #29
Avengers West Coast #55
The Uncanny X-Men #258
The Amazing Spider-Man #329
The Incredible Hulk #369
Web of Spider-Man #62-63
Damage Control (vol. 2) #2-4
Web of Spider-Man #64-65
The Avengers Annual #19

Note: Iron Man #250 has the "Acts of Vengeance!" logo on its cover, but has nothing to do with the crossover.

Collected editions

References

External links
 Acts of Vengeance at Marvel.com
 Acts of Vengeance at the Appendix to the Handbook of the Marvel Universe
 

Comics by John Byrne (comics)
Comics about revenge